Air Vietnam Flight 706 was a Boeing 727 that crashed on September 15, 1974, near Phan Rang Air Base in South Vietnam.

Hijack
Le Duc Tan, a ranger in the South Vietnamese army who had recently been demoted from captain to lieutenant for the theft of two cars in Da Nang, smooth-talked his way past security checkpoints. After taking off from Da Nang International Airport (DAD/VVDN) in South Vietnam on a regularly scheduled flight to Saigon's Tan Son Nhat International Airport (SGN/VVTS), the flight was hijacked by Tan, holding two grenades. He demanded to be flown to Hanoi in North Vietnam. For unknown reasons the pilots approached the airfield at Phan Rang Air Base but aborted the landing.

Crash
The aircraft overshot the base leg and initiated a left turn, during which it lost control.

Cause
Even though the exact cause remains unclear, it has been speculated that the hijacker caused the crash by setting off his grenades after the pilots refused to give in to his demands.

See also
 Aviation safety
 List of accidents and incidents involving commercial aircraft

References

External links
 

Airliner accidents and incidents caused by hijacking
Aviation accidents and incidents in 1974
Aviation accidents and incidents in Vietnam
Accidents and incidents involving the Boeing 727
Air Vietnam accidents and incidents
1974 crimes in Vietnam
Terrorist incidents in Asia in 1974
Mass murder in 1974
Terrorist incidents in Vietnam
September 1974 events in Asia
1970s murders in Vietnam
1974 murders in Asia